Hwagwan is a type of Korean coronet worn by women, traditionally for ceremonial occasions such as weddings. It is similar to the jokduri in shape and function, but the hwagan is more elaborate.

The hwagwan is slightly larger than jokduri and served to emphasize beauty by decorating gold, bichui and pearls on cloth.

See also
Ayam
Gache
Hanbok
Hwarot

References

External links

Korean headgear
Crowns (headgear)